Sankt Sebastian is a former municipality in the district of Bruck-Mürzzuschlag in the Austrian province of Styria. Since the 2015 Styria municipal structural reform, it is part of the municipality Mariazell.

Mariazell railway station, the terminus of the narrow gauge Mariazell line from St Pölten, lies within the municipality. The station is also the terminus of the Museumstramway Mariazell-Erlaufsee, a standard gauge heritage steam tramway that operates to the nearby Erlaufsee.

References

Cities and towns in Bruck-Mürzzuschlag District